Sloss Price King Jr. (March 6, 1925 – June 10, 2006) was an American racewalker who competed in the 1952 Summer Olympics.

References

1925 births
2006 deaths
American male racewalkers
Olympic track and field athletes of the United States
Athletes (track and field) at the 1952 Summer Olympics
Sportspeople from Fresno, California
Track and field athletes from California